The 1892 Western Maryland Green Terror football team was an American football team that represented Western Maryland College (now known as McDaniel College) as an independent during the 1892 college football season. They played one game, a 10–10 tie against Baltimore City High School. It was the second season in school history.

Schedule

References

Western Maryland
McDaniel Green Terror football seasons
College football undefeated seasons
College football winless seasons
Western Maryland Green Terror football